Epichnopterix is a genus of moths belonging to the family Psychidae.

The species of this genus are found in Europe.

Species:
 Epichnopterix alpina Heylaerts, 1900 
 Epichnopterix ardua (Mann, 1867)

References

Psychidae
Psychidae genera